Silver Creek is a stream in the U.S. state of West Virginia.

According to tradition, Silver Creek was named for the fact Indigenous peoples unearthed deposits of silver ore near the creek.

See also
List of rivers of West Virginia

References

Rivers of Wayne County, West Virginia
Rivers of West Virginia